Rogue Community College (RCC) is a public community college with campuses in both Jackson County and Josephine County, falling roughly in the geographic region known as the Rogue Valley in Southern Oregon.

History
RCC was established in November 1970 by vote of the electorate of Josephine County. On May 21, 1996, voters in Jackson and Josephine counties approved expansion of Rogue's boundaries to include all of Jackson County, for the purpose of providing a wider range of educational programs, job-training opportunities, and greater college access for students throughout the Rogue Valley.

The campus originally was constructed in the late 1960s as a federal training facility known as the Fort Vannoy Job Corps Training Center. The campus of wood-framed buildings was remodeled in 1989, along with several more recently constructed buildings providing additional classrooms and modern laboratory space.

Dr. Cathy Kemper-Pelle became the institution's sixth president on July 1, 2016.

Academics
RCC offers the Associate of Science degree and certificates. Additionally, RCC has several cooperative programs with nearby Southern Oregon University, located in Ashland, Oregon.

The college is accredited by the Commission on Colleges of the Northwest Commission on Colleges and Universities. Courses and programs are approved by the Oregon Department of Education. Professional associations have accredited those professional-technical programs which require approval. RCC is approved as a veterans training institution by the Veterans Administration.

The college is a member of the American Association of Community Colleges, the Association of Community College Trustees, and the Oregon Community College Association.

Campuses
RCC has campuses in the cities of Grants Pass, Oregon, Medford, Oregon, and White City, Oregon. The campus located in Grants Pass is known as the Redwood Campus, the campus located in Medford is known as the Riverside Campus, and the campus located in White City is known as the Table Rock Campus.

The Riverside Campus is located in downtown Medford, at ninth, Bartlett, and Riverside streets.  The three-building complex houses classrooms, labs, Student and Community Services and library services. There are two additional facilities nearby: The Fir Street Learning Center at 30 S. First Street, and the D Building, located at 313 E. Eighth Street.

The Table Rock Campus opened to students Fall term 2005. It is located at 7800 Pacific Avenue, White City. Classes that had formerly been offered at the VA Domiciliary in White City are now available at the Table Rock Campus.
An additional facility adjacent to the Table Rock Campus, the High Technology Center, which opened in September 2018, houses the Welding, Manufacturing and Mechatronics programs.

As a public institution, RCC collects funds from property taxes, the state of Oregon, any relevant grants or levies, as well as tuition.

Athletics
RCC started its athletic programs in 2013 with men's and women's soccer. The team name is called the "Ospreys".  They were not a member of the Northwest Athletic Conference.  However, in November 2014, the RCC board of trustees officially approved intercollegiate athletics at the institution (joining NWAC) starting initially with men's and women's soccer and cross country. It discontinued its cross country and long-distance track programs in 2017 and added a women's volleyball team in 2019.

See also 
 List of Oregon community colleges

References

External links
Official website

Community colleges in Oregon
Education in Josephine County, Oregon
Education in Jackson County, Oregon
Educational institutions established in 1970
Universities and colleges accredited by the Northwest Commission on Colleges and Universities
Buildings and structures in Jackson County, Oregon
Buildings and structures in Josephine County, Oregon
1970 establishments in Oregon